Nyköping Municipality held a municipal election on 14 September 2014. This was part of the local elections and being held on the same day as the general election.

Results
The number of seats remained at 61 with the Social Democrats winning the most at 22, a drop of one from 2010.

By constituency

Urban and rural

Percentage points

By votes

Elected

Electoral wards
There were three constituencies, Eastern, Northern and Western. Helgona, Herrhagen, Högbrunn and Väster covered some sparsely populated rural areas, but had the vast majority of the wards within the confines of Nyköping's urban area.

Nyköping

Rural areas

References

Nyköping municipal elections
Nyköping